Eugeniella palleola is a species of corticolous (bark-dwelling) in the family Pilocarpaceae. Found in Nicauragua, it was formally described as a new species in 2015 by lichenologists Othmar Breuss and Robert Lücking. The specific epithet palleola, meaning "rather pale", refers to the shade of the apothecial discs, which are lighter than other species of Eugeniella. Secondary chemicals that occur in the lichen include atranorin, stictic acid, and minor amounts of norstictic acid.

References

Pilocarpaceae
Lichen species
Lichens described in 2015
Lichens of Central America
Taxa named by Robert Lücking